Paulo Trindade (born 22 January 1967) is a Portuguese sprint freestyle swimmer. He competed at the 1988, 1992 and the 1996 Summer Olympics in the 50 m freestyle.

References

External links
 

1967 births
Living people
Portuguese male freestyle swimmers
Olympic swimmers of Portugal
Swimmers at the 1988 Summer Olympics
Swimmers at the 1992 Summer Olympics
Swimmers at the 1996 Summer Olympics
Place of birth missing (living people)
20th-century Portuguese people
21st-century Portuguese people